NMCP  may refer to:

National Memorial Cemetery of the Pacific
National Museum of Crime & Punishment
Naval Medical Center Portsmouth